Oh, You Dear Fridolin is a 1952 West German comedy film directed by Peter Hamel and starring Hans Reiser, Ingrid Andree and Otto Gebühr. It was shot at the Bendestorf Studios near Hamburg and on location around Munich. The film's sets were designed by the art director Hans Berthel.

Cast
 Hans Reiser as Fridolin, ein junger Dichter
 Ingrid Andree as Alice, Fotoreporter
 Otto Gebühr as Korbinian, Alices Vater
 Charlott Daudert as Gräfin Bleuforet
 Fritz Rémond Jr. as Hirschbrunner
 Max Mairich as Direktor Sturzkopf
 Willy Maertens as Dr. Mond, Verleger
 Harald Paulsen as Duellwütiger Säbelfechter
 Ilse Zielstorff as Tochter des Säbelfechters
 Hans Caninenberg as Edgar
 Paula Braend as Frau Griesmeier
 Franz-Otto Krüger as Rundfunkreporter
 Kurt Fuß as Jerome, Diener
 Knut Mahlke as Klein-Franzl
 Alf Pankarter as Ringrichter Wannemaker
 Hans Schwarz Jr. as Schmidt, alias Smith
 Apollon as Bill, ein Neger
 Albert Florath
 Susanne Navrath as Klein-Claudia
 Popescu as Neumann alias Nadolny
 Vavra  as Brettschneider alias Popolowsky

References

Bibliography 
 Hans-Michael Bock and Tim Bergfelder. The Concise Cinegraph: An Encyclopedia of German Cinema. Berghahn Books, 2009.

External links 
 

1952 films
1952 comedy films
German comedy films
West German films
1950s German-language films
Films directed by Peter Hamel
German black-and-white films
1950s German films
Films shot in Munich